Uday Shankar Pani is an Indian film maker. He graduated in 1974 from the Film and Television Institute of India. He was an assistant director in Richard Attenborough's Gandhi. A 1974 documentary on the National Film Archive of India made by Pani was screened on that organization's 52nd anniversary. In 2016, he was selected as one of thirteen jurors for that year's International Film Festival of India. He is on the faculty) at Flyking Film Academy.

Earlier years 

Uday Shankar Pani was born in east (Odisha), brought up in North (Delhi), studied in a south Indian school (Kannada) and is now settled in west (Mumbai). While growing up he was into painting cartoons, theatre, sculpturing, sports but never had any interest in cinema. He wanted to join the army but NDA rejected him and his attempts to clear dozens of competitive exams were also unsuccessful. He finally managed to get selected in Film & TV Institute of India in Pune. Joining FTII at a very young age of 18, felt like almost growing up in cinema & realised that cinema is the king of all professions. After passing out as a trained film director at the young age of 21, he assisted many film makers for a decade. He started directing his own short films from 1980s onwards.

Career 

Among the prominent short films, Pani had the launched was Hindustan Lever's' Fair & Lovely. Also he directed short films for New India Assurance, GIC, Air India, NFL, MCF, SCI, MTC, Deccan Florabase, Ford Foundation, and Nitco Tiles. Pani most famous Lijjat Udyog's papad ad with rabbit is a landmark in the world of advertisement films.

He was an assistant director to Krishna Shah in his foreign production ''Shalimar'. His major career highlight happened when hired as the 1st assistant director to Sir Richard Attenborough's 'Gandhi' and BBC's ' Jim Corbett'. Apart from directing many music videos, events, tele- shopping films, TV serials & been busy teaching in major film schools. Currently Full-time Faculty at Flyking Film Academy.

In recent past, he has been an integral part various film festivals as a jury member.

Filmography

References

Film and Television Institute of India alumni
Film directors from Odisha
Living people
Indian television directors
20th-century Indian film directors
Hindi-language film directors
Year of birth missing (living people)